Sierra Vista Southeast, often referred to as Hereford or Nicksville, is a census-designated place (CDP) in Cochise County, Arizona, United States. The population was 14,797 at the 2010 census. It includes the neighborhoods Ramsey Canyon, and Sierra Vista Estates within its boundaries.

Geography
Sierra Vista Southeast is located at  (31.488261, -110.232126).

According to the United States Census Bureau, the CDP has a total area of 112.3 square miles (290.8 km2), all  land.

Climate
In the Köppen climate classification system, Sierra Vista Southeast falls within the typical cold semi-arid climate (BSk) of mid-altitude Arizona. Fall and spring, like most other parts of Arizona, are very dry. Winters are cool to cold with frosts which can occasionally be hard freezes; frost can be expected to stop in mid- to late April. Spring, like fall, spends about half of itself within the frost season. Summer starts off dry, but progressively gets wetter as the monsoon season approaches. The city has a fairly stable climate with very little humidity. However, the North American Monsoon can bring torrential rains during the months of July and August and will produce almost half the yearly rainfall in just those two months alone. Snow is not a common sight in the CDP, though some years the city can receive several inches of snow and other years it will receive none. However, a snow-capped Miller Peak and Carr Peak in the Huachuca Mountains is a common sight for four to five months every year.

Demographics

As of the census of 2010, there were 14,797 people in the CDP. The population density was 131.8/sq mi. The racial makeup of the CDP was 69.1% White, 1.8% Black or African American, 1% Native American, 1.6% Asian, 0.2% Pacific Islander, 5.1% from other races, and 3.4% from two or more races.  17.8% of the population were Hispanic or Latino of any race.

There were 5,392 households, out of which 33.1% had children under the age of 18 living with them, 65.4% were married couples living together, 8.1% had a female householder with no husband present, and 22.8% were non-families. 18.3% of all households were made up of individuals, and 6.6% had someone living alone who was 65 years of age or older.  The average household size was 2.65 and the average family size was 3.01.

In the CDP, the age distribution of the population shows 27.0% under the age of 18, 5.6% from 18 to 24, 24.9% from 25 to 44, 29.4% from 45 to 64, and 13.1% who were 65 years of age or older.  The median age was 41 years. For every 100 females, there were 96.1 males.  For every 100 females age 18 and over, there were 94.7 males.

The median income for a household in the CDP was $46,170, and the median income for a family was $51,858. Males had a median income of $38,346 versus $26,115 for females. The per capita income for the CDP was $20,702.  About 5.4% of families and 7.3% of the population were below the poverty line, including 8.9% of those under age 18 and 5.1% of those age 65 or over.

Transportation
Cochice Connection provides bus connections between Douglas, Bisbee, and Sierra Vista, with a stop in Nicksville.

References

Census-designated places in Cochise County, Arizona